Antonio Najarro (born 22 November 1975 in Madrid, Spain) is a Spanish flamenco dancer and figure skating choreographer.                             Film: " Antonio Najarro, la danse espagnole en partage "  (2014/2015 )    53 min director: Jean-Marie David

Career

Flamenco dancer 
Najarro is one of the most recognized flamenco dancers in Spain. At age 15 he began his career getting a Distinction in Spanish Dance in the Real Conservatorio Profesional de Danza in Madrid working in the company “Ballet Teatro Español de Rafael Aguilar”, where he gained soloist roles portraying characters such as Lucas El Torero in their production of Carmen, which travelled throughout Europe. He then worked in companies including “Ballet Antología”, “José Antonio y los Ballets Españoles”, “Compañía Antonio Márquez”, and “Compañía Aída Gómez”.

He later started working as a principal dancer with Rafael Aguilar, Antonio Gades, and other artists. He also took part in the National Ballet of Spain, sharing the stage with Carla Fracci and others.

As a creator, his choreographies are part of the repertoire of dance institutions of Spain including the Real Conservatorio de Danza de Madrid, the Ballet Nacional de España, and the company “José Antonio y los Ballets Españoles”.

In 2002, he created the company Antonio Najarro, with which he has been presenting shows worldwide such as "Tango Flamenco", "Flamencoriental", and "Jazzing Flamenco".

Figure skating choreographer 
As a figure skating choreographer, his clients include: 
Jeremy Abbott
Marina Anissina & Gwendal Peizerat
Pernelle Carron & Lloyd Jones
Brian Joubert
Stéphane Lambiel
Nathalie Péchalat & Fabian Bourzat
Kaitlyn Weaver & Andrew Poje
Javier Fernandez
Sara Hurtado & Kirill Khaliavin
Sara Hurtado & Adrián Díaz

He has also been a choreographer of various ice shows such as  "Art on Ice", "Dreams on Ice", "Fantasy on Ice"  and "Champions on Ice" in Japan, Russia, France, Switzerland and the United States.

Awards 
Among others he has received this individual recognitions:

 First prize for choreography at the Eighth Choreographic Contest of Spanish Dance and Flamenco de Madrid.
 First Prize for Choreography at the First International Dance Competition, Teatro Central in Seville.
 Prize for best young choreographer Harlequin 2009.
 MAX Award for Outstanding Performance Arts Dance Men.

With his choreography, skaters have won:
 2002 Olympic gold medal in ice dancing, won by Marina Anissina & Gwendal Peizerat. Najarro choreographed their "Flamenco" original dance.
 2007 World bronze medal, Grand Prix Final gold medal and 2008 European silver medal, won by Swiss Stéphane Lambiel. Najarro choreographed "Poet" and "Otoño Porteño".

References

External links 
Official website 

1975 births
Living people
People from Madrid
Spanish male dancers
Flamenco dancers
Spanish male ballet dancers